The BRT Standard is an evaluation tool for bus rapid transit (BRT) corridors around the world, based on international best practices. The Standard establishes a common definition for BRT and identifies BRT best practices, as well as functioning as a scoring system to allow BRT corridors to be evaluated and recognized for their superior design and management aspects.

The Standard was conceived by the Institute for Transportation and Development Policy (ITDP) in 2012 to ensure that BRT corridors worldwide meet a minimum quality standard and deliver consistent passenger, economic, and environmental benefits. This is of particular relevance in countries where "BRT"s qualify for special funding from national or provincial governments. In addition to serving as an overview of BRT design elements, the Standard can be used to evaluate existing BRT corridors and certify them as a Basic, Bronze, Silver, or Gold rated corridors. Corridors which fail to meet minimum standards for Basic ratings are not considered to be BRT. The latest edition of the Standard was published in 2016.

BRT systems which do not meet the BRT standard ("Not BRT" by the ITDP), but is marketed as BRT, meet the phenomenon known as "BRT creep".

History and purpose 
First released in 2012, the BRT Standard was created “to establish a common definition of bus rapid transit (BRT) and ensure that BRT corridors more uniformly deliver world-class passenger experiences, significant economic benefits, and positive environmental impact”. The Standard was developed in response to a lack of consensus among planners and engineers as to what constitutes a true BRT corridor. Without a clear definition, the term BRT was used for corridors that provided only minor improvements in bus service and lacked the elements of BRT that make it competitive with light rail or metro alternatives. This caused a backlash against the BRT "brand", and confusion as to its benefits.

The 2014 edition made some improvements to the methodology, including adjustments to the corridor definition, infrequent-service penalties, and increased emphasis on basics. The peak and off-peak frequency design metrics have been removed, and penalties for low peak and off-peak frequencies have been added. An additional point was added to each of the BRT basic elements, to put greater emphasis on the basic elements of a BRT corridor.

The 2016 edition proposed six major changes, including greater focus on safety and system operations, separation of the design score and the full score (i.e. including both design and operations), improved dedicated right-of-way definition, new types of busway alignments, and partial points for onboard fare validation.

Technical committee and endorsers 
The BRT Standard was developed and continues to be updated by a technical committee, with strategic direction and guidance from several organizations. The current (2020) Technical Committee consist of: Aileen Carrigan (Bespoke Transit Solutions)*, Aimee Gauthier (ITDP), Angelica Castro (Transconsult)*, CarlosFelipe Pardo (NUMO), Dario Hidalgo, Gerhard Menckhoff (retired, World Bank)*, Leonardo Canon Rubiano (World Bank)*, Lloyd Wright (Asian Development Bank)*, Manfred Breithaupt (GIZ), Paulo Sérgio Custodio, Pedro Szasz, Ricardo Giesen (BRT CoE), Wagner Colombini Martins (Logit Consultoria), Walter Hook (BRT Planning International), Xiaomei Duan (Far East Mobility)*. The Standard further incorporates advice from, and has the institutional endorsement of ITDP, Gesellschaft fur Internationale Zusammenarbeit (GIZ), ClimateWorks Foundation, UN Habitat, Barr Foundation, UNEP, ICCT, World Resource Institute (WRI) Ross Center for Sustainable Cities, and the Rockefeller Foundation.

Unless indicated by an asterisk (*), each committee member also represents his or her institution.

Definition of BRT 
The BRT Standard creates a concrete “minimum standard”, identifying several critical design elements that must be present for a corridor to qualify as BRT. For each element, a best practice is identified, along with benchmarks for partial achievement of the feature.

Basic characteristics 
There are five essential characteristics of a BRT corridor.
Dedicated right-of-way — An exclusive right-of-way is vital to ensuring that buses can move quickly and unimpeded by congestion. Enforcement of the dedicated lane can be handled in different ways, such as delineators, bollards, or colorized pavement. Non-physical barriers can additionally be used for enforcement, such as onboard cameras, regular policing at points of frequent encroachment, and high fines for corridor violation by non-authorized vehicles.
 Busway alignment — Alignment of the bus lane so that conflicts with other traffic can be minimized. Options include exclusive bus-only corridor, median (central reservation) aligned, busway that runs adjacent to an "edge condition" like a waterfront or a park with few intersections, and curb aligned (but curb aligned only where there are infrequent intersections to cause traffic conflicts and delays).

Off-board fare collection — Collecting fares before boarding or validating fares on-board, through a “barrier controlled” or “proof-of-payment” method, is one of the most important factors in reducing station dwell time as it permits boarding and alighting through all bus doors rather than obliging boarding passengers to enter through a single-door (normally next to the driver). This reduces total travel time, thus improving the customer experience and facilitating faster bus turn-around, i.e. fewer buses are needed to serve a given level of passenger demand.
 Intersection treatments — There are several ways to minimize bus delays at intersections, all of which are aimed at increasing the green signal time for the bus lane. Forbidding turns across the bus lane and minimizing the number of traffic-signal phases where possible are the most important. Traffic-signal priority when activated by an approaching BRT vehicle is useful in lower-frequency corridors, or to call for an intermediate (extra) BRT phase at locations with multi-phase signal control.
Platform-level boarding — Having the bus-station platform level with the bus floor is one of the most important ways of reducing boarding and alighting times per passenger. The reduction or elimination of the vehicle-to-platform gap is also key to customer safety and comfort.

Scoring 
Points are awarded for those elements of BRT corridors that most significantly improve operational performance and quality of service. The points act as proxies for a higher quality of customer service (speed, comfort, capacity, etc.). For each element identified in the BRT Standard, a maximum point value is assigned. A given BRT corridor is then rated based on how closely it achieves the best practice of this element. 

The BRT Standard created a “minimum definition” for BRT corridors. To qualify as BRT, a corridor must: 
 be at least 3 km in length (1.9 miles); 
 score at least 4 points for busway alignment; 
 score at least 4 points for dedicated right-of-way; and
 score at or above a 20/38 in the BRT basic elements. 

The BRT Basics, as outlined in Section 3 above, have the following maximum scores:
BRT Basics [38 points] 
 Dedicated right-of-way (8 points)
 Busway alignment (8 points)
 Off-board fare collection (8 points)
 Intersection treatments (7 points)
 Platform-level boarding (7 points)

In addition to the BRT Basics, five additional categories of BRT design and planning elements are scored. These categories and elements have the following maximum scores: 
Service Planning — [19 points total]
 Multiple routes (4 points)
 Diverse services - express, limited-stop, and local (3 points)
 Control Center (3 points)
 Located in Top Ten Corridors (2 points)
 Optimized demand profile (3 points)
 Multi-corridor network connections (2 points)
 Hours of operation including late-night and weekends (2 points)

Infrastructure — [13 points total]
 Passing lanes at stations (3 points)
 Minimizing vehicle exhaust emissions (3 points)
 Station set back from intersections(3 points)
 Center stations (2 points)
 Pavement quality (2 points)

Station Design and Station-Bus Interface — [10 points total]
 Safe and comfortable stations (3 points)
 Number of doors on bus (3 points)
 Docking bays and sub-stops at high demand stations to improve bus flow (1 point)
 Reasonable distances between stations (2 points)
 Sliding doors in BRT stations (1 point)

Communications — [5 points total] 
 Branding (3 points)
 Passenger information (2 points)

Integration and Access — [15 points total] 
 Integration with other public transportation (3 points)
 Secure bicycle parking (2 points)
 Bicycle lanes (2 points)
 Bicycle-sharing integration (1 point)
 Pedestrian access and safety (3 points)
 Universal accessibility (3 points)

Once qualified as a Basic BRT, a corridor can earn up to 100 points.  After the score for the (1) BRT Basics, (2) Service Planning, (3) Infrastructure, (4) Stations, (5) Communications, and (6) Integration and Access is complete, points can be subtracted from the total score to account for operational weaknesses. These deductions prevent awarding high quality recognition to BRT corridors that have significant operational, management, or performance problems. The operations deduction elements (up to 63 points total) include the following maximum deduction:
 Low commercial speeds (10 points)
 Peak passengers per hour per direction (pphpd) below 1,000 (5 points)
 Lack of enforcement of the right-of-way (5 points)
 Significant gap between bus floor and station platform (5 points)
 Overcrowding (5 points)
 Poorly maintained infrastructure, including busway, buses, stations, and technology systems (14 points)
 Low peak frequency (3 points)
 Low off-peak frequency (2 points)
 Permitting unsafe bicycle use (2 points) 
 Lack of traffic safety data (2 points)
 Buses running parallel to the BRT corridor (6 points)
 Bus bunching (4 points)

To recognize superior performance, the Standard awards corridors scoring between 85-100 a Gold rating, between 70-84.9 a Silver, and 55-69.9 a Bronze. Many bus corridors with some BRT-like aspects fail to qualify as true BRT. Corridors which fail to meet minimum BRT standards are classified by the ITDP as "Not BRT".:34

Scored BRT corridors 
The following cities have had their BRT corridors evaluated and scored using the BRT Corridor Standard. Each corridor is ranked at either Gold, Silver, Bronze or Basic level of quality. 

In 2011, two US corridors evaluated, the Silver Line in Boston and Chelsea, Massachusetts, and the Select Bus Service (SBS) in New York City, were rated "Not BRT".

In 2014, only six US corridors were ranked as true BRT corridors, two Silver and four Bronze level. 

In 2016, no new systems reached Gold standard. Rio de Janeiro and Uberaba in Brazil; Cartagena and Bucaramanga in Colombia; and Hartford, Connecticut in the United States each had one Silver status corridor; also the Delhi Bus Rapid Transit System in India (a Basic BRT) was dismantled. 

In 2017, Albuquerque Rapid Transit (ART) in Albuquerque, New Mexico, United States, received Gold status for its design, the first such corridor in the United States. Approximately six months after the system becomes operational, the ranking is scheduled to be reassessed.

In 2019, MAX in Fort Collins, Colorado and the South Dade Transitway in Miami-Dade County, Florida, both in the United States, although not formally assessed, received preliminary rankings of at least Basic BRT.

ITDP Bus Rapid Transit Rankings, continually updated on the ITDP website:

Note: If a transit system is named, but no specific corridors or lines, the entire system is implemented in BRT technology.

Criticisms 
The BRT Standard has been noted as a one-size-fits-all tool that is not context sensitive. Also, overambitious standards may result in higher construction costs and, in particular, greater land acquisition (and resettlement) needs.  In one recent case, the technical design team insisted on aiming for Gold classification, resulting in high cost and land acquisition needs which could have been avoided with a lower classification; as a consequence the project was cancelled by political decision-makers.

In response to that criticism, those in favor of the Standard point out that the overwhelming majority of the Standard elements work well and would also benefit lower demand systems. Above all, BRT designers should take advantage of the flexibility inherent in bus systems and consider lower-standard busway sections to avoid physical or political constraints, especially where such sections can later be upgraded to address future demand increases.

There are many situations where lower-grade BRT or non-BRT bus schemes are the appropriate solution to upgrade public transit. The Standard should not be a reason to forgo such improvements. However, in many cases, the Standard provides a scoring tool that can motivate cities to develop high quality mass transit corridors where possible under the city's prevailing financial and spatial conditions.

See also
 Bus rapid transit creep — alleged application of the term "BRT" to bus systems that fall short of its design and performance standards

References

External links

Bus rapid transit